9 Lives is the third solo studio album by American rapper AZ. It was released on June 12, 2001 under the Motown imprint. Production was handled by twelve record producers, including Bink!, Darren Lighty, Eddie F and Ty Fyffe. It features guest appearances from Ali Vegas, Amil, Beanie Sigel, Foxy Brown and Joe. The album peaked at number 23 on the Billboard 200 and number 4 on the Top R&B/Hip-Hop Albums charts.

Track listing

Sample credits
Intro and Outro
"I Can't See Me Without You" by The Main Ingredient
Problems
"All This Love" by DeBarge
Love Me
"Love Me in a Special Way" by DeBarge

Charts

References

External links

2001 albums
Motown albums
AZ (rapper) albums
Albums produced by Eddie F
Albums produced by Ty Fyffe
Albums produced by Bink (record producer)